Benville Bridge, also known as Bridge #27, is a historic stone-arch bridge located on the grounds of Jefferson Proving Ground in Bigger Township, Jennings County, Indiana.  It was built in 1908, and is a three-span, round arch bridge.  It is 168 feet in length and 17 feet wide.  It was rehabilitated in 1986.

It was listed on the National Register of Historic Places in 1996.

References

Road bridges on the National Register of Historic Places in Indiana
Bridges completed in 1908
Transportation buildings and structures in Jennings County, Indiana
National Register of Historic Places in Jennings County, Indiana
1908 establishments in Indiana
Stone arch bridges in the United States